W17 may refer to:

British NVC community W17 (Quercus petraea - Betula pubescens - Dicranum majus woodland), a woodland community in the British National Vegetation Classification system
Watkins 17, an American sailboat design
Williams W-17 Stinger, American homebuilt racing aircraft designed for Formula One Air Racing by Art Williams, introduced in 1971